The National Health Insurance Company – Daman, (Arabic: ضمان) (الشركة الوطنية للضمان الصحي), headquartered in Abu Dhabi, is the largest health insurance provider in Abu Dhabi and the third largest in Dubai.

H.E. Khaled Bin Shaiban Almehairi serves as Chairman of the National Health Insurance Company – Daman, while Hamad Al Mehyas is the company's Chief Executive Officer.

Daman offers health insurance for both citizens and residents of the UAE, via its Thiqa, Abu Dhabi Basic and Enhanced plans.

Abu Dhabi Developmental Holding Company (ADQ) owns 80% of Daman's shares, with the remaining 20% owned by Munich Re, who is also a strategic partner. By being part of the ADQ network, which spans a broad portfolio of major enterprises across key sectors of Abu Dhabi's diversified economy, Daman draws on established expertise, aligning the company with ADQ's strategy and governance frameworks.
With the highest market share in the UAE, Daman covers more than 2.5 million members.

Health fund management 
Daman provides health fund management and administration services on behalf of several government entities, with the main ones being on behalf of the Abu Dhabi Government:

°	Abu Dhabi Basic Plan: subsidised standard policy with different premiums as per age group and status for low-income expatriates residing in the Emirate.

°	Thiqa programme - The Thiqa programme is a comprehensive healthcare programme offered by the Government of Abu Dhabi to UAE Nationals and those of similar status in the Emirate. Thiqa has been managed by Daman — the leading health insurance provider in the country — since 2008.

Health insurance

Daman offers a number of private insurance products across the UAE under its Enhanced portfolio:

°	Low to high-end customisable health insurance products (e.g. with modular benefits such as optical and dental)

°	Top-up plans

°	Medical travel insurance (inbound and outbound)

Medical network
Daman has contracted 3,000 healthcare providers in the UAE, with direct billing services across the country.

Online digital services
In 2021, Daman launched its Hayakom Thiqa digital branch services, which allowed its Thiqa members to access Daman's entire portfolio of services online. Following the successful launch of the Hayakom Thiqa service, Daman has now made its digital branch offering available to all of its 2.5 million members across the UAE.

Cardless insurance
In 2017, Daman phase out the use of plastic insurance cards, when it linked its insurance policies to the Emirates ID number of their policy holders. Members no longer need to show a regular insurance card when seeking treatment, as the treatment facility can obtain the insurance details of the patient using their Emirates ID number.

Diabetes management programme
In 2010, the company launched its diabetes management programme, a programme that provides nutritional and exercise advice to their diabetic patients and provides them with personal and educational support. As of March 2021, over 17,000 patients have been enrolled in the programme, and the company claims that of 4,100 patients reviewed, 63% were able to reduce their glycated haemoglobin (Hb1Ac) levels.

References

Companies based in Abu Dhabi
Government-owned companies of Abu Dhabi
Health insurance companies of the United Arab Emirates